Ligor inscription is an 8th-century stone stele or inscription discovered in Ligor, Nakhon Si Thammarat, Southern Thailand Malay Peninsula. This inscription was written and carved on two sides, the first part is called Ligor A inscription, or also known as Viang Sa inscription, while on the other side is called the Ligor B inscription written in Kawi script dated 775 CE. The Ligor B inscription was probably written by Mahārāja dyāḥ Pañcapaṇa kariyāna Paṇaṃkaraṇa (Panangkaran), king of Shailendra dynasty. This inscription was connected to the kingdom of Srivijaya and the Shailendra dynasty.

Interpretation 
Ligor A inscription  tell about a Srivijayan king named Dharmasetu, the king of kings in the world, who built the Trisamaya caitya for Kajara.

While the Ligor B inscription, dated 775 CE, written in Kawi script, contains the information about a king named Visnu who holds the title Sri Maharaja, from Śailendravamśa (Wangsa Syailendra) hailed as Śesavvārimadavimathana (the slayer of arrogant enemies without any trace). There are some different interpretations regarding the king mentioned in Ligor B inscription; some suggest that the king mentioned in this inscription was King Panangkaran, while others argue that it was his successor, King Dharanindra.

References

History of Nakhon Si Thammarat
Srivijaya
Shailendra dynasty
Nakhon Si Thammarat
8th century in Thailand